Kawther El Bardi (born on 4 September 1971) is a Tunisian actress.

Filmography

Cinema 
 1992 : Poussière de diamants by Mahmoud Ben Mahmoud and Fadhel Jaïbi
 1997 : Bent Familia by Nouri Bouzid
 1998 : Festin (short film) by Mohamed Damak
 2004 : Noce d'été by Mokhtar Ladjimi
 2005 : Khochkhach by Salma Baccar

Television

Tunisian series 
 1992 : Liyam Kif Errih by Slaheddine Essid
 1993 : El Assifa by Abdelkader Jerbi
 1997 : Al Moutahadi by Moncef Kateb
 1999 : Anbar Ellil by Habib Mselmani : Aïcha
 2001 : Dhafayer by Habib Mselmani
 2002 : Farhat Lamor by Ezzedine Gannoun
 2003 : Chez Azaïez by Slaheddine Essid : Bahiga
 2004 : Loutil (L'Hôtel) by Slaheddine Essid : Jiji (femme du directeur)
 2007 : Fi Kol Youm Hkeya 
 2008 - 2009 : Maktoub (season 1–2) by Sami Fehri : Chelbia a.k.a. Chobbi
 2010 - 2018 : Nsibti Laaziza by Slaheddine Essid : Hayet El Bahi
 2012 : Dar Louzir by Slaheddine Essid : Halima
 2021 : Ken Ya Makenech (saison 1) by Abdelhamid Bouchnak : Snow White

Algerian series 
 2008 - 2009 : Djemai Family by Djaffar Gacem : Sakina
 2015 - 2017 and 2021 : Sultan Achour 10 (seasons 1-2-3) by Djaffar Gacem : Ennouria

TV movies 
 2007 : Puissant by Habib Mselmani

Emissions 
 2009 - 2010 : Sofiène show on Tunisie 7 : juge
 2010 - 2012 : Memnou Al Rjel on Nessma : host of the "family" section
 2013 : Sghaier Saghroun on Nessma: animator
 2014 : Couzinetna Hakka on Nessma: animator
 2016 : Materna Show (season 2) on Tunisna TV : animator

Videos 
 2007 : advertising spot for the Tunisian brand Jadida
 2018 : advertising spot for the store Aziza

Theater  
 2004 : Dar El Hana, text of Jalal Eddine Saâdi and director by Ikram Azzouz
 2004 : Ah, Ah, ya Mahbouba by Abdelaziz Meherzi
 2009 : Chwaya Meddonia by Jalel Eddine Saadi  and Yosra Kasbaoui
 2009 : Hira w Tchitine, text and director by Zouhair Erraies
 2011 : Ellil Zéhi, adaptation and director by Farhat Jedid
 2011 : Mosaïque,  text and director by Zouhair Erraies
 2013 : Ahwal, text and director by Mohamed Kouka 
 2014 : 24h ultimatum, text by Jalel Eddine Saadi and director by Mongi Ben Hafsia
 2015 : Dhalamouni Habaybi, director by Abdelaziz Meherzi
 Le Génie de la passion, text by Tahar Fazaa and director by Ikram Azzouz
 Ala Wahda w Noss by Kawther El Bardi and Jalel Eddine Saadi

Radio 
 2014 : Jawwek 9-12 on Radio IFM : animator

References

External links

Tunisian film actresses
People from Tunis
1969 births
Living people
20th-century Tunisian actresses